The general speed limits in Liechtenstein are the same for every category of vehicle. They are as follows:

References

Liechtenstein
Roads in Europe